Cambodian Idol is a Cambodian reality singing competition program. It premiered on July 12, 2015 on Hang Meas HDTV and was hosted by Chea Vibol and Chan Keonimol. The winner of the inaugural season was Ny Rathana. The second season concluded on Christmas Day 2016 and was won by Chhen Manich. In early 2018, Kry Thaipov won the final season of Cambodian Idol.In fourth season won by lim tichmeng in 2022.

Format 
The series consists of three phases: 
 The Judges Auditions
 Theater Round 1
 Theater Round 2
 Green Miles
 Live Show

The Judges Auditions
All the contestants sing in front of the four judges and let the judges decide whether they can go to the next round or not. If they receive three or four "YES" from the judges, they can go to the next round. If they receive two, one, or no "YES", they cannot go through the next round.
The winners of this round will receive a golden envelope which is to show that they are able to go to the next round.

Theater Round 1
In this round, all the contestants find their own group in four or five and pick their song to sing in front of the judges. The judges then will decide who can go through the next round.

Theater Round 2
The contestants are picked to sing a song in pair by the judges. The judges will decide who can go to the Green Miles.

Green Miles
More contestants have to be eliminated in this round. Contestants pick their song to sing and need to perform well in order to proceed to the Live Show. Only 12 contestants may continue onto the Live Show.

Live Show
Contestants have to perform live on stage with the presence of an audience. Live voting occurs each round, so as to decide who will be eliminated in that particular round. After weeks of elimination, the winner of Cambodian Idol will be chosen.

Judges 
All of the four judges are pop singers in Cambodia. They are Preap Sovath, Chhorn Sovannareach, Aok Sokunkanha, and Nop Bayyareth.

Hosts 
Cambodian Idol season one is presented by Chea Vibol who has worked many years as a presenter on televisions. Chan Keonimol is a great presenter and has worked with many programs as a presenter.

Season

Season 1

Season 2

Season 1 & Finalists

Season 2 & Finalists

External links

References 

Idols (franchise)
Cambodian television series
2014 Cambodian television series debuts
2014 Cambodian television series endings
2010s Cambodian television series
Non-British television series based on British television series
Hang Meas HDTV original programming